Namiki Gohei I (1747 – June 2, 1808) was a Kabuki playwright active in Kyoto, Edo and Osaka. He wrote over 100 plays, mostly in the genres of jidai-mono (historical) and sewa-mono (current events).

Born in the Doshōmachi district in Osaka in 1747, Gohei was a student of the playwright Namiki Shōzō I. By 1775 he was already the main playwright for the Hayakumo-za Kabuki theatre in Kyoto.

Two of his plays have been translated into English, The Temple Gate and the Paulownia Crest (1778, translated by Alan Cummings) and Five Great Powers that Secure Love (1794, translated by Julie A. Iezzi), both in Kabuki Plays on Stage II: Villainy and Vengeance, 1773-1799, edited by James R. Brandon and Samuel L. Leiter.

Plays
(The following list is only a small selection of Namiki Gohei's most famous works.)

 Genpei Tsūrikimaru (1764) with Namiki Shōzō I
 Hi-no-Moto Banzei no Hōrai (1772) with Namiki Jūsuke
 Tenmangū Natane no Gokū (1777) with Nakamura Akei and Tatsuoka Mansaku
 Ōiri Kabuki no Tsuitachi (1777) with Nakamura Akei and Tatsuoka Mansaku
 Keisei Hakataori (1778)
 Kimon Gosan no Kiri (The Golden Gate and the Paulownia Crest, 1778)
 Keisei Yamato Zōshi (1784)
 Katsuragawa Renri no Shigarami (1784) adapted from a work of Suga Sensuke
 Taikō Shinkenki (1787)
 Sewa Ryōri Yaoya Kondate (1788)
 Shima Meguri Uso no Kikigaki (1794)
 Godairiki Koi no Fūjime (Five Great Powers that Secure Love, 1794)
 Suda no Haru Geisha Katagi (1796)
 Tomioka Koi no Yamabiraki (1798)
 Bandai Fueki Shibai no Hajimari (1807)

Notes

References
 Frederic, Louis (2002) Japan Encyclopedia. Cambridge, Massachusetts: Harvard University Press,  .
 Kabuki Plays on Stage II: Villainy and Vengeance, 1773-1799. (2002) University of Hawaii Press,  .

Kabuki playwrights
Japanese writers of the Edo period
1747 births
1808 deaths
Writers from Osaka
18th-century Japanese people
19th-century Japanese people
18th-century Japanese dramatists and playwrights
19th-century Japanese dramatists and playwrights